The Race of the Century was the name given to a 1986 W. S. Cox Plate, a thoroughbred horse race in held in Melbourne, Australia, between two New Zealand racehorses of the 1980s.

The W. S. Cox Plate, held annually at Melbourne's Moonee Valley Racecourse, is one of the most significant races on the Australian calendar. It considered to be the weight-for-age championship of Australia and New Zealand. The race had been won by some of the great thoroughbreds of Australasian turf since its inception in 1922, including Phar Lap, Tulloch and Kingston Town.

The race centred on the encounter between Our Waverley Star and Bonecrusher.

Bonecrusher was a New Zealand champion, having won most of the three-year-old classics, including the New Zealand Derby. His form continued in Australia, where he won the Tancred Stakes, the AJC Derby, the Underwood Stakes and the Caulfield Stakes.

In turn, Our Waverley Star had been winning almost all his races in New Zealand in the lead-up to the Cox Plate.  He had won their previous encounter on 23 August at Ellerslie in the 1200m Admiralty Handicap when Bonecrusher was third.

The race was run at a good pace, in good weather and track conditions, neither favouring or disadvantaging either horse. Our Waverley Star settled wide, in mid-field, while Bonecrusher - as usual - was towards the back of the field. At the 800 metres mark, Bonecrusher (ridden by Gary Stewart) moved around the field to be immediately shadowed by Our Waverley Star (ridden by Lance O'Sullivan).  Quickly, the two horses cleared out from the rest of the field. Race caller Bill Collins questioned whether the horses had gone too early: "Here come the New Zealanders . . . have they gone too early...?".

Our Waverley Star built up a length lead, which was countered by Bonecrusher. As they entered wide into the short home straight at the Moonee Valley Racecourse, Bonecrusher had a slender lead. Quickly, Our Waverley Star gathered in Bonecrusher and it seemed he would pull away, but Bonecrusher fought back down the straight to win by a neck at the post...to which race caller Bill Collins added, "... and Bonecrusher races into equine immortality ..."

The 1986 W. S. Cox Plate is one of the most replayed versions of the race and one of the most remembered horse races in Australia and New Zealand. "This was one of those races where the hype in the lead-up was matched, surpassed even, by the race"

Of note, the 3rd place-getter was The Filbert, another well-performed New Zealand horse. This gave New Zealand the trifecta in the race.

Placings

See also
 Thoroughbred racing in Australia
 Thoroughbred racing in New Zealand

References

External links
 Youtube video - the "Race of the Century"
 Race of the century (20th anniversary)

Horse racing in Australia
Horse racing in New Zealand